The 1970 All England Championships was a badminton tournament held at Wembley Arena, London, England, from 18–22 March 1970.

Final results

Agnes Geen married and became Agnes Van der Meulen, Marjan Ridder married and became Marjan Luesken and Lonny Funch married and became Lonny Bostofte.

Men's singles

Section 1

Section 2

+ Denotes seed

Women's singles

Section 1

Section 2

References

All England Open Badminton Championships
All England
All England Open Badminton Championships in London
All England Badminton Championships
All England Badminton Championships
All England Badminton Championships